Dawn of the Apocalypse is the fourth full-length album by the American death metal band Vital Remains. It was produced by Joe Moody and Vital Remains. The only album to feature vocalist Thorn and the last to feature bassist Joe Lewis.

Track listing

Personnel
Thorn - vocals, keyboards, programming, samples
Tony Lazaro - rhythm guitar
Joe Lewis - bass guitar
Dave Suzuki - drums, lead guitar, keyboards

References

Vital Remains albums
2000 albums